Symphony No. 20 in D major, K. 133, was composed by Wolfgang Amadeus Mozart in July, 1772, when Mozart was sixteen years old. This symphony is one of many written during the period Mozart stayed in Salzburg, between two trips to Italy. Compared to other symphonies Mozart wrote in this period, the scoring is extravagant, featuring two trumpets in addition to the standard oboes, horns, and strings. The key of D major, which is a key often reserved for ceremonial music, is well suited to the presence of these trumpets.

Structure
The symphony is scored for one flute, two oboes, two horns, two trumpets and strings.

There are four movements:

Allegro
The first movement, in D major and  time, is written in sonata allegro form, with the notable deviation of the recapitulation being the mirror image of the exposition. That is, the recapitulation starts with the second theme, and Mozart waits until the very end to unveil the return of the first theme. He does so by first bringing the theme in softly with the strings, then repeating with the strings now doubled by the trumpets.
Andante
The violins play with mutes throughout the movement, and the bass part is played pizzicato. These features, in combination, give the movement a delicate texture.
Menuetto — Trio
This minuet in D major starts boldly. A more subdued trio written primarily for strings (with a bit of oboe).
[Allegro]
The fourth movement, also in D major, is a long dance in  time cast in sonata-allegro form. Though Mozart himself did not label the tempo of the fourth movement, the character of the piece and the standard symphonic form of the time indicates that Mozart probably intended the piece to go at an "allegro" tempo.

References

External links 

20
1772 compositions
Compositions in D major